Mbrès is a sub-prefecture and town in the Nana-Grébizi Prefecture of the northern Central African Republic.

History 
On 8 June 2016 four armed groups including Anti-balaka, UPC, FPRC and MPC signed pact of non-aggression in Mbrès. On 28 March 2021 the town was captured by Russian mercenaries. They withdrew day later allowing rebels to return. Russian forces returned to Mbrès on 9 April and withdrew again on 12 April.

References 

Sub-prefectures of the Central African Republic
Populated places in the Central African Republic
Populated places in Nana-Grébizi